Bert Jansch is the debut album by Scottish folk musician Bert Jansch. The album was recorded on a reel-to-reel tape recorder at engineer Bill Leader's house and sold to Transatlantic Records for £100. Transatlantic released the album, which went on to sell 150,000 copies. The album was included in Robert Dimery's 1001 Albums You Must Hear Before You Die. It was voted number 649 in the third edition of Colin Larkin's All Time Top 1000 Albums (2000).

The record includes Jansch's best-known song, "Needle of Death", which was inspired by the death of his friend, folk singer Buck Polly.

Track listing 
All tracks written by Bert Jansch, except where specified.

References 

Bert Jansch albums
1965 debut albums
Transatlantic Records albums
Albums produced by Bill Leader